Fellsmere is a city in Indian River County, Florida, United States. It is home of the Fellsmere Frog Leg Festival and the now closed National Elephant Center. Fellsmere is the first place in Florida where women were allowed to vote. In a municipal election on June 19, 1915, resident Zena M. Dreier became the first woman to legally cast a ballot in the American South, five years before the 19th Amendment established women's suffrage nationally.

The population was 5,197 at the 2010 census, up from 3,813 at the 2000 census. As of 2018, the estimated population was 5,754. Fellsmere is part of the Sebastian–Vero Beach Metropolitan Statistical Area.

History
Fellsmere in 1915 became the first town in Florida (or anywhere south of the Mason–Dixon line) to grant women the right to vote. It also at the same time held the first election in which corporations could vote. Mrs. Zena M. Dreier was the first woman to cast a vote in the town, and E. Nelson Fell cast a vote on behalf of his company Fellsmere Farms. The town had unanimously adopted a charter in February 1915 which granted these rights, and the town charter was ratified by the state legislature without any notice being paid to this provision. This despite the fact that several statewide suffrage measures had failed in the legislature that year. Women's suffrage was not granted nationally in the U.S. until five years later (in August 1920) with the passage of the 19th Amendment.

Geography

 To the north: Palm Bay
 To the west: Blue Cypress Lake
 To the east: Sebastian

Demographics

As of the census of 2000, there were 3,813 people, 865 households, and 718 families residing in the city. The population density was 277.8/km2 (719.1/mi2). There were 918 housing units at an average density of 66.9/km2 (173.1/mi2). The racial makeup of the city was 60.11% White, 6.69% African American, 0.47% Native American, 0.10% Asian, 0.05% Pacific Islander, 30.68% from other races, and 1.89% from two or more races. Hispanic or Latino of any race were 70.0% of the population.

There were 865 households, out of which 52.6% had children under the age of 18 living with them, 66.6% were married couples living together, 8.7% had a female householder with no husband present, and 16.9% were non-families. 12.0% of all households were made up of individuals, and 5.0% had someone living alone who was 65 years of age or older. The average household size was 3.94 and the average family size was 4.18.

In the city, the population was spread out, with 33.3% under the age of 18, 15.4% from 18 to 24, 32.8% from 25 to 44, 13.0% from 45 to 64, and 5.5% who were 65 years of age or older. The median age was 26 years. For every 100 females, there were 139.5 males. For every 100 females age 18 and over, there were 149.8 males.

The median income for a household in the city was $30,395, and the median income for a family was $31,318. Males had a median income of $19,195 versus $15,521 for females. The per capita income for the city was $10,258. About 21.7% of families and 24.3% of the population were below the poverty line, including 25.2% of those under age 18 and 12.9% of those age 65 or over.

Local economy
The large Hispanic population of Fellsmere owes to the surrounding agriculture industry, namely citrus groves and other crop types. In town, many locally owned niche businesses thrive.  These include restaurants, ethnic food, architectural salvage, gifts, guitar and motorized vehicle repair establishments.

Public transportation
Fellsmere is served by the #10 bus route of GoBus Lines, providing service to the North County Transit Hub.

The first railroad to reach Fellsmere was the narrow-gauge Sebastian-Cincinnatus Railroad, built by the sons of printing magnate Anthony Octavius Russell. It was replaced by the standard-gauge Fellsmere Railroad in 1910. The line was later extended west to the now-gone town of Broadmoor before being bought by the Trans-Florida Central Railroad in 1924. The line was abandoned in 1952.

References

External links

City of Fellsmere official website
Historical marker in town noting the 1915 election, with photos

Cities in Indian River County, Florida
Cities in Florida